"Champion" is a single by Danish rapper, singer, music writer, actor Clemens. It was released in Denmark as a digital download on 10 October 2010. The song peaked at number 1 on the Danish Singles Chart. The song features vocals from Danish singer Jon Nørgaard.

Track listing
Digital download
 "Champion" (feat. Jon Nørgaard) - 4:38
 "Champion" (feat. Jon Nørgaard) [Radio Edit] - 4:05

Chart performance

Certifications

Release history

References

2010 singles
Jon Nørgaard songs
2010 songs
Universal Music Group singles
Songs written by Jon Nørgaard